Clan Innes is a Highland and Lowland Scottish clan. The clan takes its name from the lands of Innes in Moray, Scotland. The de facto chief of the clan is the Duke of Roxburghe, directly descended in the male line from the Innes Baronets, chiefs of the name.

History 
Clan Innes claims descent from a Berowald, a Flemish knight, who was given the lands of Innes by Malcolm IV of Scotland in 1160. Berowald's grandson, Walter, assumed the surname Innes and was granted a charter of confirmation by Alexander II of Scotland in 1226. In 1452, Robert Innes, the eleventh laird, fought under the Earl of Huntly at the Battle of Brechin. He later founded the Greyfriars of Elgin in an attempt to repay for his sins. The twentieth chief of Clan Innes, Sir Robert, was a Member of Parliament for Moray and was made a baronet of Nova Scotia in 1625. The third baronet, Sir James, married Lady Margaret Ker (whom through the sixth baronet inherited the Ker dukedom of Roxburghe. The twenty-fifth chief (and sixth baronet), Sir James Innes, claimed the dukedom of Roxburghe in 1805 when the previous duke died without a direct heir. Later, in 1812 the House of Lords ruled in favour of Sir James, rejecting claims by the heir female of the second earl and heir male whatsoever of the first earl. Because of the ruling Sir James took the surname Innes-Ker and was titled James Innes-Ker, 5th Duke of Roxburghe. The present duke of Roxburghe is heir to the chiefship of the clan, however since he bears the surname Innes-Ker the Lord Lyon King of Arms will not recognise him as chief of the name Innes.

Heraldry 
The crest badge suitable for clan members to wear contains the heraldic crest of a boar's head erased Proper, and the heraldic motto of BE TRAIST.

Tartans
Clan Innes has two historical tartans, They are called "Innes Red" and "Innes Hunting", Innes Red is the first Tartan discovered, However, there are many variations of the Innes Red, The most known version is titled in the Scottish Register of Tartans as "Innes (Of Moray)" other versions are called "Innes (D C Stewart)" and "Innes" the one most commonly used is "Innes (of Moray)"

The Innes Hunting tartan is the newest found tartan, It was registered on the Scottish Register of Tartans by Colin Innes of Tulchan with agreement of The Duke of Roxburghe in the Lyon Court Books 19, April, 1969. It is identical to the "Innes (miniature)" tartan taken from a miniature of Georgina Innes at Edingight.
There are many other Tartans registered to Clan Innes, These include "Innes of Cowie", "Innes Dress" and "Innes Red, Dress (Dance)".

See also
Innes Baronets

References

External links
Innes Clan Society

Scottish clans
Armigerous clans
Scoto-Norman clans
Boars in heraldry